Nerice is a genus of moths of the family Notodontidae that are commonly found in the Amazon rainforest. The species was first described by Francis Walker in 1855.

Selected species
Nerice bidentata Walker, 1855
Nerice davidi Oberthür, 1881
Nerice upina Alpheraky, 1892
Nerice aemulator Schintlmeister & Fang, 2001
Nerice dispar (Cai, 1979) 
Nerice leechi Staudinger, 1892
Nerice pictibasis (Hampson, 1897)

References

Notodontidae